Paresh Kumar Dhiraj Lal Dhanani is an Indian politician from Gujarat associated with the Indian National Congress. He is the former leader of opposition in the Gujarat Legislative Assembly. First time he was elected as an MLA from Amreli in 2002 against Purushottam Khodabhai Madhabhai Rupala. He earlier represented Amreli from 2002 to 2007.

He completed B. Com. from Saurashtra University in April 2000.

References

Gujarat MLAs 2012–2017
Living people
Indian National Congress politicians from Gujarat
Gujarat MLAs 2017–2022
Gujarat MLAs 2002–2007
Gujarati people
1976 births